Organolanthanide chemistry is the field of chemistry that studies compounds with a lanthanide-to-carbon bond. Organolanthanide compounds are different from their organotransition metal analogues in the following ways:
They are far more air- and water-sensitive and are often pyrophoric.
Chemistry in the 0 oxidation state is far more limited.  In fact, their electropositive nature makes their organometallic compounds more likely to be ionic.
They form no stable carbonyls at room temperature; organolanthanide carbonyl compounds have been observed only in argon matrices, and decompose when heated to 40 K.

σ-Bonded complexes
Metal-carbon σ bonds are found in alkyls of the lanthanide elements such as [LnMe6]3− and Ln[CH(SiMe3)2]3. Methyllithium dissolved in THF reacts in stoichiometric ratio with LnCl3 (Ln = Y, La) to yield Ln(CH3)3 probably contaminated with LiCl.

If a chelating agent (L-L), such as tetramethylethylenediamine (tmed or tmeda) or 1,2-dimethoxyethane (dme) is mixed with MCl3 and CH3Li in THF, this forms [Li(tmed)]3[M(CH3)6] and [Li(dme)]3[M(CH3)6].

Certain powdered lanthanides react with diphenylmercury in THF to yield octahedral complexes:

2 Ln + 3 Ph2Hg + 6 THF → 2 LnPh3(THF)3 + Hg (Ln = Ho, Er, Tm, Lu).

π-Bonded complexes
Cyclopentadienyl complexes, including several lanthanocenes, are known for all lanthanides. All, barring tris(cyclopentadienyl)promethium(III) (Pm(Cp)3), can be produced by the following reaction scheme: 
3 Na[Cp] + MCl3  → M[Cp]3 + 3 NaCl
Pm(Cp)3 can be produced by the following reaction:
2 PmCl3 + 3 Be[Cp]2 → 3 BeCl2 + 2 Pm[Cp]3
These compounds are of limited use and academic interest.

References